Cornelis Johannes Martijn van Geemen (born 15 December 1971 in Purmerend) is a sailor from the Netherlands, who represented his country for the first time at the 1996 Summer Olympics  in Savannah. Van Geemen took the 18th place in the Men's Mistral One Design.

Further reading

1996 Olympics (Savannah)

References

Living people
1971 births
People from Purmerend
Dutch windsurfers
Olympic sailors of the Netherlands
Dutch male sailors (sport)
Sailors at the 1996 Summer Olympics – Mistral One Design
Sportspeople from North Holland